June James may refer to:

 June James (American football) (1962–1990), American football linebacker
 June James (cricketer) (born 1925), Australian cricket player
 June James (producer) (born 1990), American music producer

 June James (physician), Canadian pediatrician